Nevada Wonders were an American soccer team, founded in 2003. The team was a member of the United Soccer Leagues (USL) Premier Development League (PDL), the fourth tier of the American soccer pyramid, until 2005, when the team left the league and the franchise was terminated.

They played their home games in the stadium on the grounds of Carson High School in Carson City, Nevada. The team's colors were white, silver and blue.

History

The Nevada Wonders were founded in 2003 to compete in the USL Premier Development League (PDL), considered the fourth tier of the American soccer pyramid. A Carson City, Nevada group, led by Randy Roser, were awarded the franchise in December 2002 to begin play in the following season, coinciding with the recent transition of former tier three USL D-3 Pro League team, Northern Nevada Aces, voluntarily becoming an amateur team and joining the newly founded Men's Premier Soccer League in 2003.

The Wonders would be coached by the former Aces coach, Paul Aigbogun, and lastly would play their home games out of Carson High School.

The club would play three seasons in the PDL before folding.

Year-by-year

Coaches
  Paul Aigbogun (2003–2005)
  Ben Callon  (2005)

Stadia
 Stadium at Carson High School, Carson City, Nevada 2003–05

References

Soccer clubs in Nevada
Defunct Premier Development League teams
2003 establishments in Nevada
2005 disestablishments in Nevada